WMJF-CD, virtual channel 39 (UHF digital channel 23), is a low-powered, Class A Ion Television-affiliated station serving Baltimore, Maryland, United States that is licensed to Towson. The station is owned by HME Equity Fund II, LLC. WMJF-CD's transmitter is located on Maryland Route 45 near the Towson Town Center mall.

History

Towson University (then Towson State University) applied for a construction permit on channel 61 in 1988 as a student television station. After eight extensions of the permit into 1994, Towson applied to reduce the station's effective radiated power by a factor of ten to just 521 watts. Station W61BT then applied for its license January 30, 1995.

W61BT was the Baltimore market's charter affiliate for The WB, which launched the same month. Station management took the chance on joining The WB after no full-powered station in the city was willing to join the network, and expressed optimism that the network affiliation for the new station would lead to cable carriage and provide a unique learning opportunity for students. By the fall, when the network was also available from WBDC (channel 50, now CW affiliate WDCW) in Washington, D.C., this had not materialized and Baltimore Sun sports media critic Milton Kent called on local cable providers to carry that station instead. The station changed its callsign to WMJF-LP in February 1996, reflecting its network's mascot, Michigan J. Frog. The WB signed a deal to move to UPN affiliate WNUV (channel 54) in July 1997, effective the following January, and a network spokesman referred to Baltimore as one of the network's "five biggest holes" in coverage.

After a brief stint as an America One affiliate, WMJF became an independent station and also carried MTV2 in 2004. WMJF was also a CNN student bureau, one of only two in the country.

WMJF was a 90% student run organization, operated under faculty advisers Dr. John MacKerron and Dr. David Reiss, and an executive board of five elected and appointed positions that they deemed necessary to help operate the station.

Towson University sold WMJF-LP to LocusPoint Networks in December 2012. The deal closed on August 8, 2013. LocusPoint then sold WMJF-CD to HME Equity Fund II on April 8, 2018. Towson University continued to operate the station until 2019. Programming and operations are handled remotely via satellite feed.

Digital television

Digital channels
The station's digital signal is multiplexed:

Spectrum reallocation
As a part of the repacking process following the 2016–2017 FCC incentive auction, WMJF-CD relocated to UHF channel 23 in summer 2020, using PSIP to display its virtual channel number as 39.

Programming
As of 2021, WMJF-CD carries the entire Ion Television schedule. The station no longer broadcasts local student programming.

WMJFNow
WMJFNow was launched in August 2006, after a beta run the previous spring. The program is run using Google Video. WMJFNow is the creation of webmaster and station president, Christopher Taydus with help from many station members including Josh Eisenberg, Joe Achard and Diego Torres. It was created to help find a new audience for the station. Taydus was quoted as saying, "I have a friend who goes to Northeastern who has been watching our sitcom Film School. We've even had guys from other countries watching." When asked about the numbers that some shows were receiving, Josh Eisenberg said, "In the college television market those are incredible numbers to be receiving. It used to be just a five-mile radius, and now anyone can see it."

References

External links
WMJF website (no longer actively maintained, but left online as an archive)

Ion Television affiliates
True Crime Network affiliates
Quest (American TV network) affiliates
Laff (TV network) affiliates
Defy TV affiliates
Heroes & Icons affiliates
TrueReal affiliates
MJF-CD
Television channels and stations established in 1995
1995 establishments in Maryland